Stand Back is the fourth studio album by Canadian rock band April Wine, released in 1975 (See 1975 in music). It became the first album by a Canadian band to achieve platinum sales in Canada.
The song "Slow Poke" features lead vocals by Myles Goodwyn that were slowed down in studio. the track Oowatanite was known for its railroad crossing like bell sound because of the taping of the drum bell between versus and guitar solos

Track listing 
All tracks written by Myles Goodwyn unless otherwise noted.
 "Oowatanite" (J. Clench) – 3:52
 "Don't Push Me Around" – 3:14
 "Cum Hear the Band" – 3:52
 "Slow Poke" – 3:47
 "Victim for Your Love" – 4:17
 "Baby Done Got Some Soul" (J. Clench) – 2:45
 "I Wouldn't Want to Lose Your Love" – 3:12
 "Highway Hard Run" – 4:01
 "Not for You, Not for Rock & Roll" – 3:14
 "Wouldn't Want Your Love (Any Other Way)" (M. Goodwyn, J. Clench) – 2:43
 "Tonite Is a Wonderful Time to Fall in Love" – 3:35

Personnel 
 Myles Goodwyn – guitars, keyboards, lead vocals
 Jerry Mercer – percussion, background vocals
 Jim Clench – bass, vocals (lead vocals on "Oowatanite" and "Baby Done Got Some Soul")
 Gary Moffet – guitars, background vocals

References 

April Wine albums
1975 albums
Aquarius Records (Canada) albums
Atlantic Records albums